The Ituango Dam, also referred to as the Pescadero-Ituango Dam or Hidroituango, is an  embankment dam currently under construction on the Cauca River near Ituango in Antioquia Department, Colombia. The primary purpose of the project is hydroelectric power generation and its power plant will have an installed capacity of  if completed. Preliminary construction on the dam began in September 2011 and the power plant was expected to begin operations in late 2018, but will not after heavy rainfall and landslides in April/May 2018 blocked the river's diversion tunnel, threatening a breach of the dam. If completed, it will be the largest power station in Colombia.

Background
The dam's feasibility study was completed in 1983 but the project was shelved in the 1990s due to an economic crisis. The final designs for the project were finished in 2008 and on 8 July 2011, the project management contract was awarded. Preliminary construction (surveying, roads, bridges, diversion tunnels) began in September 2011 and it is expected to be complete in 2013. Main works will begin thereafter and the power plant is expected to being commissioning in 2018. Development of the project is being proposed by EPM Ituango, a consortium of Empresas Publicas de Medellin (EPM) and the Antioquia government. The total cost is expected to be US$2.8 billion.

Design
The volume of the dam will be .

Diversion tunnel blockage  
Three tunnels were constructed to divert the Cauca River around the construction site. Two were eventually sealed during construction, leaving a third to divert the river. Between 28 April and 7 May 2018, three landslides blocked the tunnel, leading the reservoir to fill. Engineers attempted to open the two closed tunnels with explosives but were unsuccessful. On 10 May, when the reservoir reached the power station intake, engineers began releasing water through the unfinished power house to prevent a breach of the dam. On 12 May one of the previous sealed tunnels naturally reopened, which suddenly increased downstream flows by three times the average. This promoted evacuations downstream, eventually totaling around 25,000.

On May 16 silt build-up in a portion of the power house, the only means to drain the reservoir, led to water escaping into a transit gallery used by construction vehicles. The water eventually poured onto the downstream face of the dam, eroding the roadway and a portion of the riprap. Subsequently, EPM announced a risk of collapse existed and workers continued to fill the dam to its design height in hopes the spillway could be used to prevent an over-topping of the dam. Heavy rainfall was expected in the Cauca River basin through the end of May.

On May 19 the dam works reached level 405 masl; 5 m below cofferdam target the level. On May 25 Dr Ordoñez issued a letter expressing his panic about the situation because "Ituango project is dead and there is no control over it, so the most natural thing is to expect it to fail; we are sure that it is easier to fail than not to fail, and we are truly in a panic".

Environmental impact
Some sources argue the dam construction has severe ecological consequences, and there are displaced families, environmentalists, youth groups and concerned locals that oppose the project. Other publications argue the project will benefit millions through extra revenue towards social and infrastructure programs.

In February 2019 the Project came under increased pressure from  local and national governmental regulatory agencies  because of the closure of the river flow and the environmental and economic impact downstream. Moreover, studies from the Universidad Nacional de Colombia showed that the failure of the dam is likely unless an emergency plan was adopted. The safety of the downstream communities was highlighted as critical. By November 2022, drills evacuated 5,000 people to prepare for the operation of the dam.

See also

List of power stations in Colombia

References

External links

Dams in Colombia
Hydroelectric power stations in Colombia
Dams under construction
Earth-filled dams
Buildings and structures in Antioquia Department